Calling Lake Airport  is located  northwest of Calling Lake, Alberta, Canada.

The airstrip is operated by the Municipal District of Opportunity No. 17.

References

Page about this airport on COPA's Places to Fly airport directory

Registered aerodromes in Alberta
Municipal District of Opportunity No. 17